Pope Valley is an unincorporated community located in the small valley of the same name in the Vaca Mountains and northern Napa County, California.

It is east of Calistoga, north of Angwin, and borders Lake Berryessa, the second largest man-made lake in California.  The zip code for Pope Valley is 94567, and the area code 707.

History
Pope Valley is the home of Aetna Springs Resort, a Registered Historic Place.  Pope Valley was named after William (Julian) Pope who was granted property in Rancho Locoallomi in 1841 by acting Governor Manuel Jimeno.

On the afternoon of  July 1, 2014, a large wildfire started in the Butts Canyon area and eventually burned 4300 acres.

Geography
As of 1881, limestone was being mined in the northern part of Pope Valley.

Demographics
Pope Valley has a population of 583 people, with 6.5 people per square mile. There are 304 males and 279 females residing in Pope Valley and the median age is 43.

Government

References

Unincorporated communities in Napa County, California
Mayacamas Mountains
Unincorporated communities in California